Brega is a subgenre of Brazilian popular music. However, its definition as a musical aesthetic has been somewhat difficult, because there is not a musical rhythm properly "brega". The term is widely used to refer to popular romantic music with dramatic exaggeration or ingenuity, usually dealing with topics such as declarations of love, infidelity and love delusions.

Historically, the greatest singers of the genre are from northeastern and northern Brazil; three of its biggest icons historically were Waldick Soriano, Reginaldo Rossi and Falcão, the latter following a part of a tradition of humorous brega. Paulo Sérgio stood out for his dramatic and romantic music.

The term is also used in a pejorative way to defines what is tacky and unfashionable.

See also
Tecno brega
Music of Brazil
Kitsch

References

Brazilian styles of music
Concepts in aesthetics